Nicole Arendt and Jana Novotná were the defending champions but only Novotná competed that year with Lindsay Davenport.

Davenport and Novotná lost in the final 7–6, 3–6, 7–6 against Martina Hingis and Arantxa Sánchez Vicario.

Seeds
Champion seeds are indicated in bold text while text in italics indicates the round in which those seeds were eliminated.

 Lindsay Davenport /  Jana Novotná (final)
 Mary Joe Fernández /  Natasha Zvereva (quarterfinals)
 Martina Hingis /  Arantxa Sánchez Vicario (champions)
 Larisa Neiland /  Helena Suková (first round)

Draw

External links
 1997 Porsche Tennis Grand Prix Doubles Draw

Porsche Tennis Grand Prix
1997 WTA Tour